Eric Kwamina Otoo (1926 – c.2004) was a Ghanaian diplomat. He served as Ghana's High commissioner to Kenya from August 1970 to 1972, Ghana's ambassador to Germany from 1972 to 6 September 1974, and Ghana's ambassador to the United States of America from 9 December 1982 to 18 October 1990.

Early life and education 
Otoo was born in 1926. He had his secondary education at Mfantsipim School, Cape Coast and proceeded to the University of Ghana where he obtained his Bachelor of Arts degree in history.

Career 
Prior to joining the Ghanaian Foreign Service in 1959, Otoo taught at Mfantsipim School. From 1959 to 1960, Otoo was the Chargé d'affaires in the Ghanaian embassy in Monrovia, Liberia. In 1960, he was made the secretary of the Congo Coordination Committee at the Office of the President. This was during the Congo crisis in the early 1960s. He served in this capacity until 1962. While serving at the office of the president, he was a member of a delegation appointed by the then president, Dr. Kwame Nkrumah to the Soviet Union (now Russia) in 1961. In November 1963, he was moved to the Ministry of Defence to serve as its Principal Secretary (now Deputy Minister). He held this office until the overthrow of Kwame Nkrumah in February 1966. During the tenure of the new government (NLC government), the Ghanaian military was being restructured under a new command and he was appointed secretary to the President responsible for matters of security. During this period, he was Ghana's representative at various conferences. Between May 1966 and July 1970, he was head of the Economic, Information, and Cultural Department of the Ministry of Foreign Affairs. He was also head of the Political Department of the said Ministry. In August 1970 Otoo was appointed Ghana's high commissioner to Kenya with accreditation to the Kingdom of Lesotho, and concurrently, high commissioner-designate to Zambia. In 1972, he was made Ghana's ambassador to Germany. He served in this capacity until 26 September 1974. Upon his return to Ghana, Otoo returned to the Ministry of Foreign Affairs as a Senior Principal Secretary. He later served as head of the Ministry until his retirement in 1979. Following his retirement, he served on various boards of the United Nations and the Organisation of African Unity. He was made Chairman of the Ghana Broadcasting Corporation in 1981. On 9 December 1982, he was called out of retirement and appointed Ghana's ambassador to the United States of America with accreditations to Mexico, the Virgin Islands, Belize, and Saint Kitts and Nevis. He presented his credentials on 17 March 1983 and served in this capacity until 18 October 1990.

Personal life 
In 1956, Otoo married Mary Phillipa Ewuraba Brookman Otoo (née Brookman-Amissah).

See also 

 Embassy of Ghana in Washington, D.C.

References 

Ambassadors of Ghana to the United States
Ghanaian diplomats
1926 births
Year of death uncertain